Lee Chun-sik (born 27 November 1944) is a South Korean weightlifter. He competed in the men's middleweight event at the 1968 Summer Olympics.

References

1944 births
Living people
South Korean male weightlifters
Olympic weightlifters of South Korea
Weightlifters at the 1968 Summer Olympics
Sportspeople from Daejeon
Asian Games medalists in weightlifting
Asian Games silver medalists for South Korea
Asian Games bronze medalists for South Korea
Weightlifters at the 1966 Asian Games
Weightlifters at the 1970 Asian Games
Weightlifters at the 1974 Asian Games
Medalists at the 1966 Asian Games
Medalists at the 1970 Asian Games
Medalists at the 1974 Asian Games
20th-century South Korean people
21st-century South Korean people